Gist is an unincorporated community in Jasper County, Texas.

History
A post office called Gist was established in 1912, and remained in operation until 1955. The community has the name of the local Gist family.

References

Unincorporated communities in Jasper County, Texas
Unincorporated communities in Texas